Jon Avila (born Jonathan Mullally; 1 September 1985) is a former Filipino-Irish actor, model and ex-housemate of Pinoy Big Brother: Celebrity Edition 2.

Filmography

Television

Film

Notes

References

Filipino male models
Filipino male television actors
Filipino people of Irish descent
1985 births
Living people
Pinoy Big Brother contestants
Star Magic